Schreiber v. Sharpless, 110 U.S. 76 (1884), was a United States Supreme Court case in which the Court held charges of copyright infringement do not survive the death of the accused and may not be transferred to the executors of their will.

References

External links
 

1884 in United States case law
United States Supreme Court cases
United States copyright case law
United States Supreme Court cases of the Waite Court